Saint-Germain-du-Seudre (literally Saint Germain of the Seudre) is a small historic town on the Gironde estuary. It is a commune in the Charente-Maritime department in southwestern France.

The nearest market town is Gémozac. It is noted for its numerous vineyards, sunflower fields and the former wheat mill located in 'Moulin De La Barre'. Eutrope Dupon (1823-1897), born in Saint-Germain-du-Seudre, was a deputy (congressman) in the French National Assembly from 1893 to 1897. There is a bust of him in St-Germain.

Population

See also
Communes of the Charente-Maritime department

References

Communes of Charente-Maritime
Charente-Maritime communes articles needing translation from French Wikipedia